Peter Hutton was president of the Royal College of Anaesthetists from 2000 to 2003.

References

Presidents of the Royal College of Anaesthetists
British anaesthetists
Living people
Year of birth missing (living people)
Place of birth missing (living people)
21st-century British people